Section 51(xxx) of the Constitution of Australia grants the Commonwealth the power to make laws with respect to "the relations of the Commonwealth with the islands of the Pacific".

History

At the time of drafting, there were concerns that the power was not necessary, as the external affairs power, contained in section 51(xxix) was broad enough that it already contained this power. In his speech, Edmund Barton summarised the situation as follows:

It was later suggested that the external affairs power and the power to regulate the relations of the Commonwealth and the Pacific islands be combined, for example "external affairs, including the relations of the Commonwealth with the islands of the Pacific", although this was not eventually followed up.

Application
Because of the wide scope of the external affairs power, section 51(xxx) has remained largely unused, though it was considered in Ruhani v Director of Police (a case which dealt with the High Court of Australia's ability to hear appeals from the Supreme Court of Nauru) and was held obiter as being "conferred for reasons entirely unrelated to judicial power".

Notes and references

Notes

References

Australian constitutional law